Malindidzimu ("Hill of the Ancestral Spirits" in Kalanga) is a granite inselberg and a national historical monument situated in the Matobo National Park in south-west Zimbabwe, 25 miles (40 kilometers) south of Bulawayo. It is considered a sacred place by nationalists and indigenous groups.

Controversially, Cecil Rhodes is buried on the summit of Malindidizumu, together with Sir Charles Coghlan, Sir Leander Starr Jameson, Allan Wilson and several other white settlers.

The English name of the site is "World's View" which is not to be confused with World's View, Nyanga.

References

External links
 Big Cave Camp | Rhodes Grave / Worlds view, Malindidzimu Hill.

Inselbergs of Africa
Cecil Rhodes
Mountains of Zimbabwe
Geography of Matabeleland South Province